Elephant hunting or elephant poaching and exploitation of the ivory trade are illegal in Chad and pose a major threat to elephant populations. The profitable ivory industry is also a threat to the lives of rangers, even in the national parks, such as Zakouma National Park, the worst-affected area.

History
Elephants are often massacred in herds in and around the parks by organized poachers. The problem is worsened by the fact that the parks are understaffed and that a number of wardens have been murdered by poachers. Consequently, since the mid-1980s the elephant population has declined from 150,000 to a reported figure of just 2,000 in the Chad-Cameroon region by one source and 500 in Chad alone in 2013 according to another source because of intense poaching. American journalist Lisa Ling has visited Chad to explore the country's elephant poaching problem.

In a July 2012 attack by mounted poachers near the SOS Elephants camp in the Chari-Baguirmi Region, 28 elephants were slaughtered and most of their tusks were removed. The Sudanese military have been blamed for the attacks and the slaughtering of elephants not only in Zakouma and elsewhere in Chad, but also in other African nations, including Cameroon. As of 2012, a small team was responsible for battling to protect the remaining 450 elephants in Zakouma. One of the worst massacres took place in 14–15 March 2013 when 89 elephants, including 33 pregnant females and 15 calves, were slaughtered by poachers near the town of Gamba.

Conservation efforts
Stephanie Vergniault, a French lawyer, screenwriter, and conservationist who has been working in Chad since 2009, founded the SOS Elephants organization to protect the elephant population. In an interview in 2010, Vergniault stated that the population of elephants in Chad had declined by 85 percent in the previous three decades, and that if the same rate of poaching continues, "not a single elephant" would be alive in Chad within three years.

See also
Elephant hunting in Kenya
Hunting license

References

Environmental issues in Chad
Economy of Chad
Elephant hunting
Environmental conservation
Hunting by country